Zhao Zongqi (born 1955) is a general (shang jiang) of the People's Liberation Army (PLA) of China and a former Commander of the Western Theater Command.

Zhao was born in Bin County, Heilongjiang province. In his earlier year he was the deputy chief of staff of the Tibet Military District.  In August 1999, he was promoted to chief of staff of the Tibet Military District, then deputy commanding officer of the Chongqing Mobilization District. In October 2004, he was named commander of the 14th Group Army.  In September 2007, he was transferred to the 13th Group Army as commander. In December 2007, he was named chief of staff of the general staff of the Jinan Military Region.  In November 2012 he was named commander of the Jinan Military Region. On July 31, 2015, he was promoted to the rank of general.

On February 1, 2016, Zhao was named commander of the re-organized Western Theater Command and served in this position till December 2020. During his term in the Western Theatre, he oversaw China's response to the 2017 Doklam standoff and the management of 2020 standoff with India in Ladakh.

On February 28, 2021, he was appointed vice-chairperson of the National People's Congress Foreign Affairs Committee.

Zhao was a member of the 18th Central Committee of the Chinese Communist Party.

References 

1955 births
Living people
People's Liberation Army generals from Heilongjiang
Politicians from Harbin
Commanders of the Jinan Military Region
Members of the 18th Central Committee of the Chinese Communist Party
Chiefs of Staff of the Jinan Military Region
Commanders of Western Theater Command
Chinese Communist Party politicians from Heilongjiang
People's Republic of China politicians from Heilongjiang
Members of the 19th Central Committee of the Chinese Communist Party